Jon Storm Park is a public park in Oregon City, in the U.S. state of Oregon. Named after a community volunteer who died in 1994, the park opened in 2008 and has a picnic shelter and plaza.

References

External links

 Jon Storm Park at the City of Oregon City

2008 establishments in Oregon
Oregon City, Oregon
Parks in Clackamas County, Oregon